Yanderra is a small village situated on the border of the Southern Highlands and Macarthur Region of New South Wales, Australia.

Geography
Yanderra is part of Wollondilly located between Bargo and Southern Highlands' Yerrinbool, and is located next to the Hume Highway. It is an area within the area of Wollondilly, New South Wales, and is located 78 km from Sydney extending over an area of 2.743 square kilometres. Yanderra has an approximate population of 661 citizens. It is in the Australian Eastern Daylight Time zone. The area is often affected by earthquakes.

Population
The name Yanderra comes from an Aboriginal word for turpentine tree. The Yanderra is home to the Rural Fire Brigade in the jurisdiction of the township of Yanderra.

Transport
A railway station was located at Yanderra on the Main South railway line between 1924 and 1975. The station has now been demolished and no trace remains.

Notes and references

Towns in the Macarthur (New South Wales)
Wollondilly Shire
Main Southern railway line, New South Wales